Xiangyang Subdistrict is a subdistrict in Xuanzhou District, Xuancheng, Anhui, China. , it has 3 residential communities and 5 villages under its administration.

See also 
 List of township-level divisions of Anhui

References 

Township-level divisions of Anhui
Xuancheng